Ham Il-nyon (born 28 July 1952) is a North Korean rower. He competed in the men's coxless four event at the 1972 Summer Olympics.

References

1952 births
Living people
North Korean male rowers
Olympic rowers of North Korea
Rowers at the 1972 Summer Olympics
Place of birth missing (living people)